Grand Island Senior High  is the only high school in the Grand Island Public Schools (GIPS) system in Nebraska, United States. It has had several buildings over its history. The official mascot is the Islander, a tall man in a tropical grass skirt.

History
In 1908, a new building was built for high school students at 10th Street and Walnut Street, although high school education in an all-grades building had been going on before that. In 1925, a new building was constructed at 500 Walnut Street; the 1908 building was turned into a junior high school.

In 1955, a fourth building was constructed in the 2100 block of Lafayette Avenue and its predecessor became Walnut Junior High. In the late 1990s, a two-story section was added onto the main building.

GISH adopted an "academy" system for the 2019-2020 school year, making students choose one of five tracks to focus on. As a part of this system, Grand Island Senior High has expanded to three total campuses, including a technically focused Career Pathways Institute, and an education, law and public safety focused Wyandotte Learning Center.

Athletics
Islander athletic teams compete in the Heartland Athletic Conference.

denotes co-championship

Performing arts
Grand Island has three competitive show choirs, the mixed-gender "Ultimate Image" and "Future Image" as well as the all-female "Sweet Revelation". The program also hosts an annual competition, the Islander Invitational.

Notable alumni
 Patrick Deuel, one of the heaviest people in the world
 Tom Rathman, National Football League (NFL) fullback (San Francisco 49ers, Oakland Raiders)
 Bobby Reynolds, football halfback
 Rebecca Richards-Kortum, Rice University professor, MacArthur Fellow
 Jeff Richardson, Major League Baseball infielder (Cincinnati Reds, Pittsburgh Pirates, Boston Red Sox)
 Bob Smith, NFL halfback

References

Educational institutions in the United States with year of establishment missing
Grand Island, Nebraska
Public high schools in Nebraska
School buildings on the National Register of Historic Places in Nebraska
Schools in Hall County, Nebraska
National Register of Historic Places in Hall County, Nebraska